The Peugeot 206 WRC is a World Rally Car based on the Peugeot 206. It was used by Peugeot Sport, Peugeot's factory team, in the World Rally Championship from 1999 to 2003. The car brought Peugeot the manufacturers' world title three years in a row from 2000 to 2002. Marcus Grönholm won the drivers' title in 2000 and 2002.

History

In 1999, Peugeot Sport unveiled the 206 WRC, and it competed for the first time in that year's World Rally Championship, with French tarmac veteran and long-time marque stalwart Gilles Panizzi narrowly failing, against a resurgent reigning champion in Mitsubishi's Tommi Mäkinen, to win the Rallye Sanremo. The car was soon a success, however, and won both the manufacturers' and drivers' championships in 2000, Peugeot's first such accolades since their withdrawal from the WRC after Group B was banned after the 1986 season, and achieved in the hands of Panizzi, Francois Delecour and Mäkinen's successor as drivers' world champion, Marcus Grönholm.

For 2001, Grönholm competed alongside two refugees of SEAT's exit from the championship at the end of 2000; compatriot Harri Rovanperä and the French 1994 world champion, Didier Auriol. Rovanperä and Auriol each contributed single wins, on Swedish Rally and Rally Catalunya respectively (the former to be a sole career win for the Finn, and the latter victory helped by assorted problems for the blisteringly quick debuting Citroën Xsara WRCs), before Auriol left the team at the end of the season. Grönholm, meanwhile, suffered sufficient reliability woes in the first half of the year such that he could manage no higher than fourth overall in the series, although Peugeot did fend off Ford, with a 1-2 result by the two Finns on the season-ending Rally of Great Britain to successfully defend the constructors' championship title.

In 2002, Grönholm – despite now being paired in the factory line-up with defending 2001 champion from Subaru, the Briton Richard Burns – led Peugeot to a repeat of the WRC title double aboard his 206 WRC. His dominance that year was compared to Michael Schumacher's dominance of Formula One. In summary, Peugeot won two drivers' championships, in 2000 and 2002, and three manufacturers' titles in a row between 2000 and 2002. However, by 2003 the 206 WRC was beginning to show its age and was less effective against the competition, notably the newer Xsara WRC and the Subaru Impreza WRC, so it was retired from competition at the end of the season, to be replaced with the 307 WRC, albeit, unlike its predecessor, based not on the production version's hatchback, but its coupé cabriolet body style.

The Peugeot 206 WRC was awarded the Autosport "Rally Car of the Year" in 2002, preceded by the Ford Focus RS WRC and followed by the Citroën Xsara WRC. Peugeot GB created a Peugeot 206 rally championship aimed at young drivers. The championship was created to help young drivers develop their careers. The cars were built by Vic Lee Racing and drivers such as Tom Boardman, Luke Pinder and Garry Jennings all drove in the championship.

WRC victories

External links

Rally car statistics – juwra.com (World Rally Archive)
Peugeot 206 WRC at ewrc-results.com

World Rally Cars
206 WRC
All-wheel-drive vehicles
World Rally championship-winning cars